Pál Lakatos (born 7 June 1968 in Vásárosnamény) is a retired boxer from Hungary, who represented his native country at two Summer Olympics: in 1992 (Barcelona, Spain) and 2000 (Sydney, Australia). He once won the silver medal at the European Championships, in 1993 (Bursa, Turkey), and thrice captured the bronze medal in the Light Flyweight (– 48 kg) at the European Championships, in 1991, 1998 and 2000.

Amateur Highlights 
Silver medalist at the European Championships in Light Flyweights, in 1993, Bursa, Turkey
Three-times bronze medalist at the European Championships in 1991, 1998 and 2000
Member of the Hungarian Olympic Team of Barcelona in Light Flyweights
Member of the Hungarian Olympic Team of Sydney in Light Flyweights
13x Hungarian champion
1992 Olympic Results - Boxed as a Light Flyweights (48 kg)
1st Round - Defeated Vladimir Ganzcenko of Unified Team URS, RSC-2
Round of 16 - Defeated Dong-Bum Cho of South Korea, 20-15
Quarterfinals - Lost to Daniel Petrov of Bulgaria, 8-17
2000 Olympic Results - Boxed as a Light Flyweights (48 kg)
1st Round - bye
Round of 16 - Lost to Kim Un-Chol of North Korea, 8-20

Pro career
In 2001 Lakatos became a pro. A year later he fought for the TWBA Super Flyweight Title in Torredembarra, but was beaten by Algeria-born Lahcene Zemmouri from Spain. He ended his professional career in 2004, with a negative record: five wins (three knock-outs), eleven losses and two draws.

External links
 
sports-reference

1968 births
Living people
People from Vásárosnamény
Flyweight boxers
Boxers at the 1992 Summer Olympics
Boxers at the 2000 Summer Olympics
Olympic boxers of Hungary
Hungarian male boxers
Sportspeople from Szabolcs-Szatmár-Bereg County